Jovan Beleslin (Serbian Cyrillic: Јован Белеслин; born 1 October 1919) is a Serbian former football player. He was born in Hungary.

A strong full-back with excellent header, he started playing with ŽAK Subotica when he got registered for the senior team in May 1937. His best years were spent while playing for BSK Belgrade between 1938 and 1945. After World War II, he played for Spartak Subotica and Belgrade clubs Red Star, Partizan and SD Milicionar where in 1950 he finished his career as a player/manager.

He played one match for the Yugoslavia national football team, on November 12, 1939, in a friendly match against Hungary (a 2-0 loss) played in Belgrade.

He was also a football referee between 1952 and 1968.

References

1919 births
Possibly living people
Serbian footballers
Yugoslav footballers
Yugoslavia international footballers
ŽAK Subotica players
FK Spartak Subotica players
OFK Beograd players
Red Star Belgrade footballers
FK Partizan players
FK Milicionar players
Association football defenders
Immigrants to Yugoslavia
Hungarian emigrants